Same-sex marriage in Michigan has been legal since the U.S. Supreme Court's ruling in Obergefell v. Hodges on June 26, 2015. The U.S. state of Michigan had previously banned the recognition of same-sex unions in any form after a popular vote added an amendment to the Constitution of Michigan in 2004. A statute enacted in 1996 also banned both the licensing of same-sex marriages and the recognition of same-sex marriages from other jurisdictions.

On March 21, 2014, the U.S. District Court for the Eastern District of Michigan ruled the state's denial of marriage rights to same-sex couples unconstitutional. More than 300 same-sex couples married in Michigan the next day before the Sixth Circuit Court of Appeals stayed enforcement of the district court's decision. On November 6, the Sixth Circuit reversed the lower court's ruling and upheld Michigan's ban on same-sex marriage. The state was ordered to recognize the 323 marriages performed on March 22, and the state announced it would not appeal that order.

Legal history

Statutes
In June 1995, the Michigan House of Representatives voted 88–14 to ban same-sex marriage in the state, and the Michigan State Senate voted 31–2 in favor. That same month, the House approved by a 74–28 vote a bill banning recognition of out-of-state same-sex marriages. The Senate also approved this bill. Governor John Engler signed both bills into law.

Constitutional amendment 
In 2004, voters approved a constitutional amendment, Michigan Proposal 04-2, that banned same-sex marriage and civil unions in the state. It passed with 58.6% of the vote. The Michigan Supreme Court later ruled that public employers in Michigan could not grant domestic partnership benefits given the restrictions imposed by the amendment.

Lawsuits

DeBoer v. Snyder 

On January 23, 2012, a lesbian couple filed a lawsuit, DeBoer v. Snyder, in the U.S. District Court for the Eastern District of Michigan, challenging the state's ban on adoption by same-sex couples. In August 2012, Judge Bernard A. Friedman invited the couple to amend their suit to challenge the state's ban on same-sex marriage, "the underlying issue". On March 7, 2013, Friedman announced that he would delay ruling pending the outcome of two same-sex marriage cases before the U.S. Supreme Court, United States v. Windsor and Hollingsworth v. Perry. Friedman held a trial from February 25 to March 7, 2014. On March 21, he ruled for the plaintiffs, ending Michigan's denial of marriage rights to same-sex couples. Attorney General Bill Schuette immediately filed an emergency motion requesting a stay of the ruling.

Four of Michigan's 83 county clerks opened their offices on Saturday, March 22, to issue marriage licenses to same-sex couples: Barbara Byrum of Ingham County, Nancy Waters of Muskegon County, Lisa Brown of Oakland County, and Lawrence Kestenbaum of Washtenaw County. The four counties issued 323 marriage licenses to same-sex couples that day. The Sixth Circuit Court of Appeals temporarily stayed enforcement of Friedman's ruling that same day, and stayed the ruling indefinitely on March 25. On March 28, U.S. Attorney General Eric Holder announced that the federal government would recognize the validity of the same-sex marriages licensed on March 22.

On November 6, 2014, the Sixth Circuit reversed the lower court's ruling and upheld Michigan's ban on same-sex marriage. The case was later incorporated into Obergefell v. Hodges and decided along with several other Sixth Circuit court cases related to the legality of state bans on same-sex marriage. On June 26, 2015, the U.S. Supreme Court handed down a ruling in favor of the plaintiffs and legalized same-sex marriage throughout the United States. The court held that the Due Process and Equal Protection clauses of the Fourteenth Amendment guarantee same-sex couples the right to marry. Governor Snyder issued the following statement, "Our state government will follow the law and our state agencies will make the necessary changes to ensure that we will fully comply.", and Attorney General Schuette said the state would "honor, respect and uphold the decision of the Supreme Court of the United States". Representative Debbie Dingell said, "Love is love. It's not ours to judge. Today the Supreme Court affirmed that individuals can love whomever they choose. I'm simply happy for my friends, April and Jayne, who have five wonderful children they want to be able to adopt and love. I can't wait to attend their wedding." State Senator Jim Ananich called it a "great day for everyone who believes in equal rights", and Representative Sander Levin said it was a "historic day, reflecting what each of us knows in our hearts and within our communities, we are all equal and should be able to marry who we love." Representatives Brenda Lawrence and John Conyers also welcomed the court decision. The Majority Leader of the Michigan Senate, Arlan Meekhof, said he was "disappointed" and "concerned by the Court's decision to disregard states' rights in favor of the federal government". Michigan's Catholic bishops released a statement that the ruling would "have a significant ripple effect upon the first amendment right to religious liberty".

Caspar v. Snyder
Eight same-sex couples represented by the American Civil Liberties Union (ACLU) filed suit in U.S. district court on July 25, 2014, seeking recognition of their so-called "window marriages" established on March 21 and 22, 2014 before the Sixth Circuit Court of Appeals stayed the district court's ruling in DeBoer. The state had asked the district court to suspend proceedings pending final resolution of DeBoer or to find those marriages invalid. On January 15, 2015, U.S. District Judge Mark A. Goldsmith ruled that the state must recognize those marriages, but stayed implementation of his ruling for 21 days. He wrote: "In these circumstances, what the state has joined together, it may not put asunder." On February 4, Governor Rick Snyder announced that the state would recognize those marriages and would not appeal the decision.

Carrick v. Snyder
In January 2015, Pastor Neil Patrick Carrick of Detroit brought a case, Carrick v. Snyder, against Michigan, arguing that the state's ban of same-sex marriage and polygamy violated the Free Exercise and Equal Protection clauses of the U.S. Constitution. The case was dismissed for lack of standing in February 2016.

Developments after legalization
Following the 2022 elections, in which the Democratic Party won full control of the state government for the first time since 1983, some Democratic lawmakers said they were considering introducing a constitutional amendment to repeal the 2004 ban. Representative Jeremy Moss said, "Regardless of what happens with Obergefell in the future – which obviously, there is a threat it could be overturned – right now, we have unconstitutional language in our Constitution. […] We should be working now, as we should have been working, to repeal the language in our constitution that bans marriage equality." Attorney General Dana Nessel said she would push for such an amendment to be passed and placed on the ballot for approval by voters.

Native American nations
Same-sex marriage is legal on the reservations of the Bay Mills Indian Community, the Keweenaw Bay Indian Community, the Little Traverse Bay Bands of Odawa Indians, and the Sault Tribe of Chippewa Indians, four federally recognized Ojibwe tribes. The Little Traverse Bay Bands of Odawa Indians was the first Native American tribe to legalize same-sex marriage in Michigan when its Tribal Council voted to legalize in March 2013. The Tribal Chairman, Dexter McNamara, signed the legislation on March 15, 2013, and the first couple, Tim LaCroix and Gene Barfield, were married near Harbor Springs that same day. The Tribal Code states: "Marriage means the legal and voluntary union of two persons to the exclusion of all others". The Keweenaw Bay Indian Community Tribal Council voted in November 2014 to hold a non-binding referendum on legalizing same-sex marriage on the reservation. The referendum was held on December 13, 2014, and passed with 54% of the vote. Provisions permitting same-sex marriages to be performed were included into the Tribal Code after the Tribal Council approved the changes on June 6, 2015. The Sault Tribe of Chippewa Indians legalized same-sex marriage on July 7, 2015, and the Bay Mills Executive Council approved a marriage ordinance permitting same-sex marriages to be solemnized on their reservation on July 8, 2019.

Same-sex marriage has also been legal on the reservation of the Pokagon Band of Potawatomi Indians since May 8, 2013. The first same-sex marriage was performed for Daniel Hossler and Enrico Perez in Dowagiac on June 20, 2013. Same-sex marriage has also been legal in the Hannahville Indian Community since August 3, 2015. Potawatomi society has traditionally recognized two-spirit individuals who were born male but wore women's clothing and performed everyday household work and artistic handiwork which were regarded as belonging to the feminine sphere. Ruth Landes reported in 1970 that they were "said to possess visions…but not to practice sorcery. [Mnedokwék] exemplified a distinct category of 'power'." Many agokwe were wives in polygnyous households. This two-spirit status thus allowed for marriages between two biological males to be performed among the tribe.

Demographics and marriage statistics
Data from the 2000 U.S. census showed that 15,368 same-sex couples were living in Michigan. By 2005, this had increased to more than 22,000 couples, likely attributed to same-sex couples' growing willingness to disclose their partnerships on government surveys. Same-sex couples lived in all counties of the state. Most couples lived in Wayne, Oakland and Macomb counties, but the county with the highest percentage of same-sex couples was Washtenaw (0.7% of all county households). Same-sex partners in Michigan were on average younger than opposite-sex partners, and more likely to be employed. However, the average and median household incomes of same-sex couples were lower than different-sex couples, and same-sex couples were also far less likely to own a home than opposite-sex partners. 18% of same-sex couples in Michigan were raising children under the age of 18, with an estimated 7,800 children living in households headed by same-sex couples in 2005.

2019 estimates from the United States Census Bureau showed that there were 23,727 same-sex households in Michigan, representing about 0.6% of all households in the state. The bureau estimated that 53% of same-sex couples in the state were married.

Domestic partnerships 
In May 2008, the Michigan Supreme Court held that the amendment added to the State Constitution in 2004 banned not only same-sex marriage and civil unions, but also public employee domestic partnership benefits such as health insurance. The ruling, however, had little effect since most public employers relaxed their eligibility criteria to avoid violating the amendment's restrictions.

On September 15, 2011, the Michigan House of Representatives voted 64–44 to approve a bill that would have banned most public employers, though not colleges and universities, from offering health care benefits to the domestic partners of their employees. It did not apply to workers whose benefits are established by the Michigan Civil Service Commission. On December 7, 2011, the Michigan State Senate approved the bill in a 27–9 vote. On December 22, 2011, Governor Rick Snyder signed the legislation into law. Five same-sex couples challenged the law in Bassett v. Snyder. On June 28, 2013, U.S. District Judge David M. Lawson issued a preliminary injunction blocking the state from enforcing its law banning local governments and school districts from offering health care benefits to their employees' domestic partners. He wrote: "It is hard to argue with a straight face that the primary purpose—indeed, perhaps the sole purpose—of the statute is other than to deny health benefits to the same-sex partners of public employees. But that can never be a legitimate governmental purpose". He rejected the state's arguments that "fiscal responsibility" was the law's rationale. On February 14, 2014, the state asked him to lift that preliminary injunction, repeating its arguments about the "fiscal insecurity of local governments" and eliminating "irrational and unfair" local programs. On November 12, 2014, Judge Lawson issued a permanent injunction barring the state from enforcing this law.

Local domestic partnerships
While there are no statewide recognition, these local governments recognize domestic partnerships: Ann Arbor, Detroit, East Lansing, and Kalamazoo, as well as Ingham, Washtenaw, and Wayne counties.

Public opinion
{| class="wikitable"
|+style="font-size:100%" | Public opinion for same-sex marriage in Michigan
|-
! style="width:190px;"| Poll source
! style="width:200px;"| Date(s)administered
! class=small | Samplesize
! Margin oferror
! style="width:100px;"| % support
! style="width:100px;"| % opposition
! style="width:40px;"| % no opinion
! style="width:40px;"| % refused
|-
| Public Religion Research Institute
| align=center| March 8–November 9, 2021
| align=center| ?
| align=center| ?
|  align=center| 70%
| align=center| 28%
| align=center| 2%
| align=center| -
|-
| Public Religion Research Institute
| align=center| January 7–December 20, 2020
| align=center| 1,670 random telephoneinterviewees
| align=center| ?
|  align=center| 67%
| align=center| 29%
| align=center| 4%
| align=center| -
|-
| Public Religion Research Institute
| align=center| April 5–December 23, 2017
| align=center| 2,348 random telephoneinterviewees
| align=center| ?
|  align=center| 63%
| align=center| 29%
| align=center| 8%
| align=center| -
|-
| American Values Atlas/Public Religion Research Institute
| align=center| May 18, 2016–January 10, 2017
| align=center| 2,997 random telephoneinterviewees
| align=center| ?
|  align=center| 56%
| align=center| 36%
| align=center| 8%
| align=center| -
|-
| American Values Atlas/Public Religion Research Institute
| align=center| April 29, 2015–January 7, 2016
| align=center| 2,379 random telephoneinterviewees
| align=center| ?
|  align=center| 54%
| align=center| 38%
| align=center| 8%
| align=center| -
|-
| New York Times/CBS News/YouGov
| align=center| September 20–October 1, 2014
| align=center| 2,560 likely voters
| align=center| ± 2.4%
|  align=center| 47%
| align=center| 39%
| align=center| 14%
| align=center| -
|-
| EPIC-MRA
| align=center| September 25–29, 2014
| align=center| 600 adults
| align=center| ± 4%
| align=center| 47%
| align=center| 47%
| align=center| 6%
| align=center| -
|-
| EPIC-MRA
| align=center| May 17–20, 2014
| align=center| 600 likely voters
| align=center| ± 4%
|  align=center| 47%
| align=center| 46%
| align=center| 7%
| align=center| -
|-
| American Values Atlas/Public Religion Research Institute
| align=center| April 2, 2014–January 4, 2015
| align=center| 1,670 random telephoneinterviewees
| align=center| ?
|  align=center| 55%
| align=center| 37%
| align=center| 5%
| align=center| -
|-
| Marketing Resource Group of Lansing
| align=center| March 2014
| align=center| ?
| align=center| ?
| align=center| 45%
|  align=center| 50%
| align=center| 5%
| align=center| -
|-
| State of the State Survey
| align=center| December 16, 2013–February 10, 2014
| align=center| 1,008 adults
| align=center| ± 3.1%
|  align=center| 54%
| align=center| 36%
| align=center| -
| align=center| -
|-
| Glengariff Group Inc.
| align=center| January 29–February 1, 2014
| align=center| 600 likely voters
| align=center| ± 4%
|  align=center| 56.2%
| align=center| 33.8%
| align=center| -
| align=center| -
|-
| Glengariff Group Inc.
| align=center| May 8–10, 2013
| align=center| 600 voters
| align=center| ± 4%
|  align=center| 56.8%
| align=center| 37.6%
| align=center| 5.6%
| align=center| -
|-
| EPIC-MRA
| align=center| May 2013
| align=center| 600 likely voters
| align=center| ± 4%
|  align=center| 51%
| align=center| 41%
| align=center| 8%
| align=center| -
|-
| State of the State Survey
| align=center| June 12–August 13, 2012
| align=center| 1,015 adults
| align=center| ?
|  align=center| 56%
| align=center| 39%
| align=center| 5%
| align=center| -
|-
| Public Policy Polling
| align=center| May 24–27, 2012
| align=center| 500 voters
| align=center| ± 4.4%
| align=center| 41%
|  align=center| 45%
| align=center| 14%
| align=center| -
|-
| Glengariff Group Inc.
| align=center| May 10–11, 2012
| align=center| 600 likely voters
| align=center| ± 4%
|  align=center| 44.3%
| align=center| 43.7%
| align=center| 11%
| align=center| 1%
|-
| Public Policy Polling
| align=center| July 21–24, 2011
| align=center| 593 voters
| align=center| ± 4%
| align=center| 33%
|  align=center| 53%
| align=center| 14%
| align=center| -
|-
| Glengariff Group Inc.
| align=center| January 2011
| align=center| ?
| align=center| ?
| align=center| 38.5%
|  align=center| 50.2%
| align=center| 11.3%
| align=center| -
|-
| State of the State Survey
| align=center| 2010
| align=center| ?
| align=center| ?
| align=center| 48%
|  align=center| 51%
| align=center| 1%
| align=center| -
|-
| Glengariff Group Inc.
| align=center| October 2004
| align=center| ?
| align=center| ?
| align=center| 24%
|  align=center| 61%
| align=center| 15%
| align=center| -
|-

See also 
LGBT rights in Michigan
Michigan Proposal 04-2
Domestic partnership in the United States
Same-sex marriage in the United States

References 

LGBT rights in Michigan
Michigan
2014 in LGBT history
2015 in LGBT history
2014 in Michigan
2015 in Michigan